Sangita Kumari (born 24 December 2001) is an Indian field hockey player and member of  Indian women hockey team.

Early life
Sangita Kumari was born in the village of Karangaguri Nawatoli in Simdega district of in state of Jharkhand to Ranjit Majhi and Lakhmani Devi. She was selected in state women hockey training centre in 2012.

Career

Under–21
In 2016, Sangita was named in the India U–21 squad for a five-nations tournament in Valencia.

Sangita was not named in the junior squad again until 2022, for the FIH Junior World Cup in Potchefstroom.

National team
Sangita made her senior debut for India in 2022. Her first appearance was during season three of the FIH Pro League, in India's homes matches against Spain. In her debut match, she scored her first international goal. In 2022 Commonwealth Games, Indian women hockey team won bronze medal.

International goals

References

External links
 
 Sangita Kuamri at Hockey India

2001 births
Living people
Indian female field hockey players
Female field hockey forwards
Field hockey players at the 2022 Commonwealth Games
Sportswomen from Jharkhand
Commonwealth Games bronze medallists for India
Commonwealth Games medallists in field hockey
People from Simdega district
Nagpuria people
Medallists at the 2022 Commonwealth Games